Gaetano Aronica (born 30 September 1963) is an Italian actor known for playing the Roman general Varus in the 2020 Netflix television series Barbarians. 
He also starred in Malèna (2000), Il Capo dei Capi (2007) and Baarìa (2009).

He is from Agrigento, Sicily.

References 

Italian actors
People from Agrigento

Living people

Year of birth missing (living people)